Dover Hill is an unincorporated census-designated place in Center Township, Martin County, in the U.S. state of Indiana.

History
A post office was established at Dover Hill in 1846, and remained in operation until 1906. The community was likely named after Dover, in England.

Geography

Demographics

References

Census-designated places in Martin County, Indiana
Census-designated places in Indiana